Beka'ot is an Israeli settlement organized as a moshav in the West Bank. Located in the Jordan Valley with an area of 1,800 dunams, it falls under the jurisdiction of Bik'at HaYarden Regional Council.

The international community considers Israeli settlements in the West Bank illegal under international law, but the Israeli government disputes this.

History
The village was established in 1972, and was initially called Buka.

The Israel Defense Forces has a roadblock on the main highway leading to the moshav, known as the Beka'ot Checkpoint. It has been the scene of several fatal incidents; on 8 January 2011 a 20-year-old Palestinian man was shot dead while trying to throw a pipe bomb at soldiers. The previous week another Palestinian, aged 20, had been shot dead. On 26 June 2015 a 25-year-old armed Palestinian was shot dead, and on 9 January 2016 two Palestinian men, aged 23 and 38, were shot dead attempting to stab IDF soldiers.

References

Moshavim
Agricultural Union
Israeli settlements in the West Bank
Populated places established in 1972
1972 establishments in the Israeli Military Governorate